Charles E. Kupchella (born July 7, 1942) is an American academic administrator who served as the 10th president of the University of North Dakota (UND) in Grand Forks, North Dakota. He began his presidency in 1999 and retired in 2008. He was succeeded by Robert Kelley effective July 1, 2008.

Early life and education 
Kupchella is a native of Nanty Glo, Pennsylvania. In 1964, he graduated from Indiana University of Pennsylvania with a B.S.Ed. and a Pennsylvania biology teaching certification. He then studied at St. Bonaventure University, where, in 1968, he was awarded a Ph.D. in physiology.

Career 
He was a consultant for the North Central Association of Colleges and Schools prior to its dissolution, and has served as a reviewer for a number of other organizations, such as the American Cancer Society, the National Institutes of Health, and the National Science Foundation. He is currently professor emeritus at the University of North Dakota.

During Kupchella's tenure, he managed the allocation of a $100 million gift to UND by benefactor Ralph Engelstad and the subsequent construction of the Ralph Engelstad Arena. He also contended with the North Dakota Fighting Sioux controversy and a burgeoning student body that increased by several thousand during his presidency.

Personal life 
He lives in Pennsylvania with his wife Adele, a cancer survivor. They have three children.

References

External links
Office of UND President Dr. Charles Kupchella website

Living people
People from Nanty Glo, Pennsylvania
Presidents of the University of North Dakota
St. Bonaventure University alumni
Indiana University of Pennsylvania alumni
1942 births